The closing ceremony of the 2002 Winter Olympics took place on an abstract shaped ice rink designed by Seven Nielsen at Rice–Eccles Stadium in Salt Lake City, the United States, on 24 February 2002.

Ceremony

Opening

Parade of Nations 
The flag bearers of 78 National Olympic Committees entered Rice–Eccles Stadium informally in single file, ordered by the English alphabet. Behind them marched all the athletes, with no grouping by nationality accompanied by music directed by Mark Watters.

Speeches, closing and flag handover  
SLOC President Mitt Romney delivered a speech, thanking everyone. IOC President Jacques Rogge delivered a speech, awarding the Olympic Order in Gold to Romney and declared the Games closed. The Mayor of Salt Lake City Rocky Anderson handed the Olympic flag to Rogge, who then handed it to the Mayor of Torino, Sergio Chiamparino, in preparation for the 2006 Olympics. The flag was raised in Athens on August 13, 2004 during the opening ceremony of the 2004 Summer Olympics.

Anthems
 National Anthem of the United States performed by NSYNC
 National Anthem of Greece
 National Anthem of Italy
 Olympic Hymn

References

closing ceremony
Ceremonies in the United States
Olympics closing ceremonies